Prescopranone is a key intermediate in the biosynthesis of scopranones. Prescopranone is the precursor to scopranone A, scopranone B, and scopranone C, which are produced by Streptomyces sp. BYK-11038.

Biosynthesis 

The biosynthesis of prescopranone follows the module structure of a Type I polyketide synthase(PKS) with three elongation modules and a lactonizing thioesterase domain. Genome mining of Streptomyces sp. BYK identified a scopranone biosynthetic gene cluster containing 3 genes, sprA, sprB, and sprC, that encode modular PKSs.

A starter acyl carrier protein is loaded with malonyl-CoA, and decarboxylated by a ketosynthase (KSQ). The starter unit is then transferred to module 1, which elongates the polyketide chain with ethyl malonyl-CoA. The tailoring domain of this module reduces the β-carbonyl to an alkene. Module 2 elongates the polyketide with ethylbutyl-malonyl-CoA. Finally, module 3 elongates the polyketide chain with ethyl malonyl-CoA, and is released upon the lactonization of the polyketide product by a thioesterase domain. Following the cyclization and release of the polyketide, the product undergoes a keto-enol tautomerism to form prescopranone.
Both modules 2 and 3 contain dysfunctional ketoreductase (KR) domains, which do not reduce the β-carbonyl due to missing NAD(P)H binding motifs and tyrosine residues in their active sites.
Prescopranone undergoes post-PKS transformations to form scopranones. Additionally, the deletion of a downstream gene sprT can disrupt biosynthesis of scopranones in Streptomyces avermitilis SUKA54. The products of this mutated pathway have yet to be elucidated.

Research 
Prescopranone and similar compounds are currently being investigated as bone morphogenetic protein (BMP) inhibitors for the treatment of fibrodysplasia ossificans progressiva (FOP).

References 

Lactones
Enols